Michel-Maurice Lévy (Ville d'Avray 1883 - 1965) was a French composer, best known for the opera Le Cloître.

Recordings
Le Cloître Robert Massard, Adrien Legros, Jean Giraudeau, Andre Vessieres, Orchestre National de l'ORTF, Maurice-Paul Guiot 1962

References 

1883 births
1965 deaths
People from Ville-d'Avray
20th-century French composers